The 1945 Hazara Rebellion was a rebellion by the Hazaras in the Kingdom of Afghanistan which occurred in 1945 and 1946. Its causes laid in the introduction of a new tax imposed only on the Hazaras. It began in November 1945, when Hazara Rebels under Ibrahim Khan, also known as "Bačča-Gāw-sawār" (Son of the bull rider) revolted against the local administration of Shahristan. After a siege lasting for about a week, the district, as well as arms and ammunition, fell into the hands of the rebels.

There are two different accounts as to how the rebellion ended: According to Encyclopædia Iranica, the Afghan government sent a force to pacify the region and subsequently withdrew the tax. According to Niamatullah Ibrahimi, it ended In spring 1946, when Mohammed Zahir Shah sent a delegation to the rebels, offering to lift the tax if the rebels laid down their arms, which was accepted.

References 

1945 in Afghanistan
Conflicts in 1945
1946 in Afghanistan
Conflicts in 1946
Military history of Afghanistan
Rebellions in Afghanistan
Hazarajat